The 2004–05 Washington Capitals season was their 31st National Hockey League season. Its games were cancelled as the 2004–05 NHL lockout could not be resolved in time.  As a result, Alexander Ovechkin would not make his NHL debut until the start of the 2005–06 season.

Schedule
The Capitals preseason and regular season schedules were announced on July 13 and July 14, 2004, respectively.

|-
| 1 || September 23 || Philadelphia Flyers
|-
| 2 || September 30 || @ Philadelphia Flyers
|-
| 3 || October 2 || @ Pittsburgh Penguins
|-
| 4 || October 6 || Pittsburgh Penguins
|-
| 5 || October 8 || @ Carolina Hurricanes
|-
| 6 || October 9 || Carolina Hurricanes
|-

|-
| 1 || October 16 || @ Atlanta Thrashers
|-
| 2 || October 19 || Atlanta Thrashers
|-
| 3 || October 21 || Montreal Canadiens
|-
| 4 || October 23 || New York Islanders
|-
| 5 || October 29 || @ Tampa Bay Lightning
|-
| 6 || October 31 || @ Florida Panthers
|-
| 7 || November 3 || New Jersey Devils
|-
| 8 || November 5 || Ottawa Senators
|-
| 9 || November 6 || @ Philadelphia Flyers
|-
| 10 || November 9 || @ Montreal Canadiens
|-
| 11 || November 11 || Detroit Red Wings
|-
| 12 || November 13 || New Jersey Devils
|-
| 13 || November 16 || Phoenix Coyotes
|-
| 14 || November 18 || Pittsburgh Penguins
|-
| 15 || November 20 || New York Islanders
|-
| 16 || November 23 || @ Toronto Maple Leafs
|-
| 17 || November 24 || Philadelphia Flyers
|-
| 18 || November 26 || New York Rangers
|-
| 19 || November 28 || Florida Panthers
|-
| 20 || December 1 || @ Anaheim Mighty Ducks
|-
| 21 || December 2 || @ Los Angeles Kings
|-
| 22 || December 4 || @ San Jose Sharks
|-
| 23 || December 6 || @ New York Islanders
|-
| 24 || December 9 || @ New York Rangers
|-
| 25 || December 11 || Atlanta Thrashers
|-
| 26 || December 14 || New York Rangers
|-
| 27 || December 17 || Dallas Stars
|-
| 28 || December 18 || @ New York Islanders
|-
| 29 || December 21 || @ Pittsburgh Penguins
|-
| 30 || December 22 || St. Louis Blues
|-
| 31 || December 26 || Tampa Bay Lightning
|-
| 32 || December 28 || Ottawa Senators
|-
| 33 || December 31 || @ Atlanta Thrashers
|-
| 34 || January 1 || Pittsburgh Penguins
|-
| 35 || January 3 || Nashville Predators
|-
| 36 || January 5 || Carolina Hurricanes
|-
| 37 || January 8 || @ Atlanta Thrashers
|-
| 38 || January 9 || Buffalo Sabres
|-
| 39 || January 12 || @ Florida Panthers
|-
| 40 || January 14 || @ Tampa Bay Lightning
|-
| 41 || January 16 || Minnesota Wild
|-
| 42 || January 17 || @ Carolina Hurricanes
|-
| 43 || January 20 || @ St. Louis Blues
|-
| 44 || January 22 || Florida Panthers
|-
| 45 || January 24 || Philadelphia Flyers
|-
| 46 || January 27 || @ Boston Bruins
|-
| 47 || January 28 || Montreal Canadiens
|-
| 48 || January 30 || Atlanta Thrashers
|-
| 49 || February 1 || @ Ottawa Senators
|-
| 50 || February 3 || @ Toronto Maple Leafs
|-
| 51 || February 4 || @ Pittsburgh Penguins
|-
| 52 || February 6 || Boston Bruins
|-
| 53 || February 8 || Tampa Bay Lightning
|-
| 54 || February 10 || @ Buffalo Sabres
|-
| 55 || February 15 || @ Boston Bruins
|-
| 56 || February 19 || @ Phoenix Coyotes
|-
| 57 || February 20 || @ Dallas Stars
|-
| 58 || February 22 || @ Buffalo Sabres
|-
| 59 || February 24 || Colorado Avalanche
|-
| 60 || February 26 || Carolina Hurricanes
|-
| 61 || February 27 || @ Carolina Hurricanes
|-
| 62 || March 1 || Chicago Blackhawks
|-
| 63 || March 3 || @ Philadelphia Flyers
|-
| 64 || March 4 || @ New Jersey Devils
|-
| 65 || March 7 || @ New York Rangers
|-
| 66 || March 8 || @ Montreal Canadiens
|-
| 67 || March 11 || @ Florida Panthers
|-
| 68 || March 12 || @ Tampa Bay Lightning
|-
| 69 || March 15 || @ Carolina Hurricanes
|-
| 70 || March 16 || Columbus Blue Jackets
|-
| 71 || March 18 || Florida Panthers
|-
| 72 || March 20 || Toronto Maple Leafs
|-
| 73 || March 22 || @ Calgary Flames
|-
| 74 || March 24 || @ Vancouver Canucks
|-
| 75 || March 26 || @ Edmonton Oilers
|-
| 76 || March 28 || @ Ottawa Senators
|-
| 77 || March 31 || Boston Bruins
|-
| 78 || April 2 || Tampa Bay Lightning
|-
| 79 || April 4 || Carolina Hurricanes
|-
| 80 || April 6 || Buffalo Sabres
|-
| 81 || April 8 || Toronto Maple Leafs
|-
| 82 || April 9 || @ New Jersey Devils
|-

Transactions
The Capitals were involved in the following transactions from June 8, 2004, the day after the deciding game of the 2004 Stanley Cup Finals, through February 16, 2005, the day the  season was officially cancelled.

Trades

Players acquired

Players lost

Signings

Draft picks
Washington's picks at the 2004 NHL Entry Draft, which was held at the RBC Center in Raleigh, North Carolina on June 26–27, 2004.

Notes

References

Wash
Wash
Washington Capitals seasons
Cap
Cap